Adipogenesis is the formation of adipocytes (fat cells) from stem cells. It involves 2 phases, determination, and terminal differentiation. Determination is mesenchymal stem cells committing to the adipocyte precursor cells, also known as preadipocytes which lose the potential to differentiate to other types of cells such as chondrocytes, myocytes, and osteoblasts. Terminal differentiation is that preadipocytes differentiate into mature adipocytes. Adipocytes can arise either from preadipocytes resident in adipose tissue, or from bone-marrow derived progenitor cells that migrate to adipose tissue.

Introduction
Adipocytes play a vital role in energy homeostasis and process the largest energy reserve as triglycerol in the body of animals. Adipocytes stay in a dynamic state, they start expanding when the energy intake is higher than the expenditure and undergo mobilization when the energy expenditure exceeds the intake. This process is highly regulated by counter regulatory hormones to which these cells are very sensitive. The hormone insulin promotes expansion whereas the counter hormones epinephrine, glucagon, and ACTH promote mobilization. Adipogenesis is a tightly regulated cellular differentiation process, in which mesenchymal stem cells committing to preadipocytes and preadipocytes differentiating into adipocytes. Cellular differentiation is a change of gene expression patterns which multipotent gene expression alters to cell type specific gene expression. Therefore, transcription factors are crucial for adipogenesis. Transcription factors, peroxis proliferator-activated receptor γ (PPARγ) and CCAAT enhancer-binding proteins (C/EBPs) are main regulators of adipogenesis. Comparing with cells from other lineage, the in vitro differentiation of fat cells is authentic and recapitulates most of the characteristic feature of in vivo differentiation. The key features of differentiated adipocytes are growth arrest, morphological change, high expression of lipogenic genes and production of adipokines like adiponectin, leptin, resistin (in the mouse, not in humans) and TNF-alpha.

Differentiation
In vitro studies on differentiation have used the pre-committed preadipocyte lineage, such as 3T3-L1 and 3T3-F442A cell line, or preadipocytes isolated from the stromal-vascular fraction of white adipose tissue. In vitro differentiation is a highly ordered process. Firstly, proliferating preadipocytes arrest growth usually by contact inhibition. The growth arrest followed by the earliest events, including a morphological change of preadipocyte from the fibroblast-shape to the round-shape and the induction of transcription factors C/EBPβ, and C/EBPδ. The second phase of growth arrest is the expression of two key transcription factors PPARγ and C/EBPα which promote expression of genes that confer the characteristics of mature adipocytes. These genes include adipocyte protein (aP2), insulin receptor, glycerophosphate dehydrogenase, fatty acid synthase, acetyl CoA carboxylase, glucose transporter type 4 (Glut 4) and so on. Through this process, lipid droplets accumulate in the adipocyte. However, preadipocytes cell lines have difficult to different to differentiate into adipocytes. Preadipocytes display CD45−  CD31− CD34+ CD29+ SCA1+ CD24+ surface markers can proliferate and differentiate to adipocytes in vivo.

Models of in vitro differentiation

Transcriptional regulations

PPARγ 
PPARγ is a member of the nuclear-receptor superfamily and is the master regulator of adipogenesis. PPARγ heterodimerizes with retinoid X receptor (RXR) and then binds to DNA, which activates the promoters of the downstream genes. PPARγ induces fat-cell specific genes, including aP2, adiponectin and phosphoenolpyruvate carboxykinase (PEPCK). PPARg activation has effects on several aspects of the mature adipocyte characteristics such as morphological changes, lipid accumulation, and the acquisition of insulin sensitivity. PPARγ is necessary and sufficient to promote fat cell differentiation. PPARγ is required for embryonic stem cells (ES cells) differentiation to adipocytes. The expression of PPARγ itself is sufficient to convert fibroblast into adipocytes in vitro. Other pro-adipogenic factors like C/EBPs and Krüppel-like factors (KLFs) have been shown to induce the PPARγ promoter. Moreover, PPARγ is also required to maintain the expression of genes that characterize the mature adipocyte. Thiazolidinediones (TZDs), antidiabetic agents which well used differentiation cocktail in vitro, promoting the activity of PPARγ.

C/EBPs 
C/EBPs, transcription factors, are members of the basic-leucine zipper class. cAMP, an inducer of adipogenesis, can promote expression of C/EBPβ and C/EBPδ. At the early stage of differentiation, the transient increase of C/EBPβ and C/EBPδ mRNA and protein levels are thought to activate the adipogenic transcription factors, PPARγ and C/EBPα. PPARγ and C/EBPα can feedback to induce the expression of each other as well as their downstream genes. C/EBPα also plays an important role in the insulin sensitivity of adipocytes. However, C/EBPγ suppresses differentiation which might due to inactivation by C/EBPβ.

Transcriptional cascade 
Although PPARγ and C/EBPα are master regulators of adipogenesis, other transcription factors function in the progression of differentiation. Adipocyte determination and differentiation factor 1 (ADD1) and sterol regulatory element binding protein 1 (SREBP1) can activate PPARγ by the production of an endogenous PPARγ ligand or directly promote the expression of PPARγ. cAMP-responsive element binding protein promotes differentiation, while the activation of PPARγ and C/EBPα is also responsive to negative regulation. T-cell factor/lymphoid enhancer-binding factor (TCF/LEF), GATA2/3, retinoic acid receptor α, and SMAD6/7 don't affect the expression of C/EBPβ and C/EBPδ but inhibit the induction of PPARγ and C/EBPα.

Other regulations
Products of endocrine system such as insulin, IGF-1, cAMP, glucocorticoid, and triiodothyronine effectively induce adipogenesis in preadipocytes.

Insulin and IGF1 
Insulin regulates adipogenesis through insulin-like growth factor 1 (IGF1) receptor signaling. Insulin/IGF1 promotes the induction transcription factors regulating terminal differentiation.

Wnt signaling 
Wnt/β-catenin signaling suppresses adipogenesis, by promoting the differentiation of mesenchymal stem cells into myocytes and osteocytes but blocking the commitment to the adipocytic lineage. Wnt/β-catenin inhibits the differentiation of preadipocytes by inhibiting the induction of PPARγ and C/EBPα.

BMPs 
Bone morphogenetic proteins (BMPs) are transforming growth factor β (TGFβ) superfamily members. BMP2  can either stimulates the determination of multipotent cells or induce osteogenesis through different receptor heteromers. BMPs also promotes the differentiation of preadipocytes.

Senescent cells 
Senescent adipose progenitor cells in subcutaneous adipose tissue has been shown to suppress adipogenic differentiation. Reduced adipogenesis in obese persons is due to increased senescent cells in adipose tissue rather than reduced numbers of stem/progenitor cells.

References 

Cell biology